Joanna Carswell (born 8 July 1988) is a New Zealand female tennis player.

Carswell has a career high WTA singles ranking of 810, achieved on 8 May 2017.

Playing for New Zealand in Fed Cup, she has a career W/L record of 1–0.

External links
 
 
 

1988 births
Living people
New Zealand female tennis players
Sportspeople from Thames, New Zealand
Tennis players from Auckland
20th-century New Zealand women
21st-century New Zealand women